Henry Somerset, 5th Duke of Beaufort  (16 October 1744 – 11 October 1803) was an English courtier and politician. He was the only son of Charles Noel Somerset, 4th Duke of Beaufort and Elizabeth Somerset, Duchess of Beaufort. Styled Marquess of Worcester from 1746, at his father's death on 28 October 1756, he succeeded him as 5th Duke of Beaufort, 7th Marquess of Worcester, 11th Earl of Worcester, and 13th Baron Herbert.

Life

On 18 October 1760, he began his studies at Oriel College, Oxford, graduating on 7 July 1763 with a Doctor of Civil Laws (DCL) degree.

He held the office of Grand Master of the Premier Grand Lodge of England between 1767 and 1772. From 1768 to 1770, he was Master of the Horse to the Queen Consort. He was appointed Lord-Lieutenant of Monmouthshire in 1771 and Lord-Lieutenant of Brecknockshire in 1787, holding both offices until his death in 1803, as well as that of Lord-Lieutenant of Leicestershire from 1787 to 1799. He was appointed Colonel of the Monmouthshire Militia on 23 December 1771 and assumed command of the Monmouth and Brecon Militia when the combined regiment was embodied on 1 February 1793. He remained in  command until his death.

He was invested as a Knight of the Order of the Garter (KG) on 2 June 1786. His last will was dated from 21 June 1789 to 11 September 1800. On 4 June 1803, shortly before his death, he succeeded to the title of 5th Lord Botetourt.

The 5th Duke of Beaufort is buried at St Michael and All Angels Church, Badminton.

Family

On 2 January 1766, he married Elizabeth Boscawen, daughter of Hon. Edward Boscawen, Admiral of the Blue, and sister to George Boscawen, 3rd Viscount Falmouth. Elizabeth died 15 June 1828. Together they had four daughters and nine sons:

 Henry Charles Somerset, 6th Duke of Beaufort, his heir and successor
 Lord Charles Henry Somerset (2 December 1767 – 18 February 1831)
 Lord Edward Somerset (1768–1769)
 Lord Norborne Berkeley Henry Somerset (4 May 1771 – 1838)
 Lady Elizabeth Somerset (11 February 1773 – 5 May 1836), who married, on 27 June 1796, Very Reverend Charles Talbot, Dean of Salisbury, grandson of Charles Talbot, 1st Baron Talbot, with whom she had three daughters and three sons
 Lady Frances Elizabeth Somerset (3 April 1774 – 24 May 1841)
 Lady Harriet Isabella Elizabeth Somerset (9 July 1775 – 1 June 1855), married Colonel Hugh Henry Mitchell and had two daughters and one son
 Lord Robert Edward Henry Somerset (19 December 1776 – 1 September 1842)
 Lord Arthur John Henry Somerset (1780–1816)
 Rev. Lord William George Henry Somerset (2 September 1784 – 14 January 1861), Prebendary of Bristol, who was married twice; on 29 June 1813 to Elizabeth Molyneux (d.1843), daughter of Lt.-Gen. Sir Thomas Molyneux, 5th Baronet, with whom he had five sons, and in 1844 to Frances Westby Brady (d. 31 August 1854). They had no children.
 Lady Anne Elizabeth Somerset (7 June 1786 – 22 September 1803)
 Col. Lord John Thomas Henry Somerset (30 August 1787 – 3 October 1846)
 Fitzroy James Henry Somerset, 1st Baron Raglan (30 September 1788 – 28 June 1855)

Ancestry
Henry Somerset and Richard III were both male-line descendents of Edward III, Henry through Edward's 4th son John of Gaunt and Richard through Edward's 5th son Edmund of Langley.  But Y-DNA of Henry's descendants did not match Richard III, meaning that somewhere in one of their pedigrees, there was a false paternity event.

References

1744 births
1803 deaths
British Militia officers
13
05
105
Knights of the Garter
Lord-Lieutenants of Brecknockshire
Lord-Lieutenants of Leicestershire
Lord-Lieutenants of Monmouthshire
Masters of foxhounds in England
Brecknockshire Militia officers
Henry Somerset, 05th Duke of Beaufort
Freemasons of the Premier Grand Lodge of England
Grand Masters of the Premier Grand Lodge of England